Aiglon (English translation: "young eagle") were motorcycles made in France between 1908 and 1953, with engines ranging in size from 123cc to 500cc.

References

External links
1929 sales brochure

Defunct motorcycle manufacturers of France